The Last Song is a 2010 American coming-of-age teen romantic drama film developed alongside Nicholas Sparks' 2009 novel of the same name. The film was directed by Julie Anne Robinson in her feature film directorial debut and co-written by Sparks and Jeff Van Wie. The Last Song stars Miley Cyrus, Liam Hemsworth, and Greg Kinnear, and follows a troubled teenager as she reconnects with her estranged father and falls in love during a summer in a quiet Southern United States beach town.

Sparks was approached to write both the film's screenplay and the novel. Sparks completed the screenplay in January 2009, prior to the completion of the novel, making The Last Song his first script to be optioned for film. The setting, originally in North Carolina like the novel, relocated to Georgia after the states had campaigned for months to host production. Upon beginning production in Tybee Island, Georgia, and nearby Savannah, The Last Song became the first movie to be both filmed and set in Tybee Island. Filming lasted from June 15 to August 18, 2009, with much of it occurring on the island's beach and pier.

The Last Song was released by Touchstone Pictures on March 31, 2010, and was later released on Blu-ray and DVD on August 17, 2010. The film garnered negative reviews from critics, with many criticizing the script and Cyrus's performance, who felt she was miscast in the role. In spite of this, it grossed $89 million worldwide against a $20 million budget making it a box office success.

Plot

At 17, Veronica "Ronnie" Miller has been rebellious since her parents divorced and her father moved to Georgia three years ago. She had been caught shoplifting in NYC, where she lives. Once a child prodigy pianist under her father, Steve Miller, Ronnie hasn't played piano nor spoken with him since. Juilliard School has been interested in her since she was young, but she refuses to attend.

Kim Miller sends the teen and her younger brother, Jonah, to spend the summer with Steve and reconnect. He is a former Juilliard School professor and concert pianist, who now lives quietly in Wrightsville Beach, his home town. He's making a replacement stained-glass window for the local church lost in a recent fire.

Upon arrival, Ronnie is hostile towards everyone, including handsome, popular Will Blakelee. He crashes into her during a volleyball match, dumping her shake on her. Shrugging him off, Ronnie meets Blaze, an outcast who lives with her boyfriend Marcus. That night, by a beach campfire, he hits on Ronnie and Blaze mistakenly thinks it's the other way around. In revenge, Blaze later gets her arrested for shoplifting.

Later, Ronnie discovers a loggerhead sea turtle nest by her dad's. Protecting it from raccoons, she meets Will again as he is an aquarium volunteer. After spending the whole night defending the eggs together, she discovers he is deeper guy than expected, and they connect on a deeper level.

The next day, Will takes Ronnie to the aquarium. She is told that it is part of his m.o. with girls. When Will returns to the turtle's nest, an irate Ronnie says she won't be just another girl and they should end it. They kiss passionately, becoming a couple. 

Will takes Ronnie home believing his parents are away. She discovers he lives in a large, gated mansion and ends up meeting his parents as they returned early. After an awkward dinner, alone outside Will reveals his brother passed away recently. Will and Ronnie profess their mutual love, and she shows him she is a talented pianist. 

At Will’s volleyball game, Ronnie hears locals blame her father for the church fire, but ignores them. When she receives the invitation to Will’s sister’s wedding, she shows her father in the church ruin and they discuss what caused the fire. When a distraught Ronnie laments about what he said to Will, he asks Scott to divulge the truth about what happened, but he refuses. 

On the way to get a dress, Ronnie sees Marcus abandoning Blaze. So she gives her all the money from Steve, so Jonah helps her pay for and pick out her dress, At the wedding, as Ronnie and Will are enjoying themselves, Blaze thanks her: she has left Marcus and moved home. He suddenly arrives, causing a scene and provoking Will when he insults Ronnie. 

Will and Ronnie arrive back at Steve’s and Jonah bursts out as the turtle eggs are hatching. While watching the eggs hatch, Steve collapses and is brought to the hospital. His terminal cancer has spread to his lungs which is why Ronnie and Jonah are there for the summer. 

Ronnie stays with Steve in the hospital while Jonah and Will continue with the stained-glass window. Steve’s cancer progresses and he eventually requests hospice at home. As Will and Jonah finished the window, they take Steve to see it installed. Feeling even more pressure from knowing the truth about the church fire, Will asks Scott again to confess, and he finally agrees. 

Scott and Will come over and finally explain: Scott, Will, and other friends were behind the church horsing around with Marcus and his friends. Will had left, while Scott stayed. The church accidentally ignited as they were playing with fire. Scott allowed Steve to take the blame, although Will wanted to report the crime to the police. He did not out of loyalty to Scott. Steve insists on not reporting it and is OK with taking the blame. Ronnie overhears and breaks up with Will. 

Kim arrives once they know of Steve’s condition. Jonah and Steve have a tearful moment before Jonah goes home to NYC while Ronnie stays to take care of him. She tries to make up for lost time with her father. She continues working on his composition (titled "For Ronnie"), as his hands ache. He is sitting, listening to her play, and dies just as she finishes.

At his funeral, Ronnie declares that no words could ever show how wonderful her father really was. Instead, she shares with them their song. As she sits to play, sunlight shines through the stained-glass window. She smiles as she feels he's there.

After the funeral, outside the church, Will tells Ronnie that both he and her dad liked the song and disappears into the crowd. Having decided to attend Juilliard, she is packing up to return to NYC when she sees Will outside. He apologizes for everything, surprising Ronnie by revealing that he will be transferring to Columbia University to be with her and they passionately kiss.

Cast

 Miley Cyrus as Veronica "Ronnie" L. Miller, an angry, rebellious 17-year-old forced to spend a summer with her estranged father. She later falls in love with Will.
 Liam Hemsworth as Will Blakelee, a popular and skilled beach volleyball player, Will aspires to attend a top university and volunteers at the Georgia Aquarium. He is Ronnie's love interest.
 Greg Kinnear as Steve Miller, Ronnie and Jonah's father, Kim's ex-husband, and former Juilliard School professor and concert pianist, who moved to Georgia after his divorce. After being diagnosed with terminal cancer and despite loving his family, he separated from them in order to cope.
 Kelly Preston as Kim Miller, Ronnie and Jonah's mother and Steve's ex-wife who raised her children in New York City after her divorce.
 Bobby Coleman as Jonah Miller,<ref name="lastsongbegun">{{cite web  | last = Touchstone Pictures  | author-link = Touchstone Pictures  | title = Touchstone Pictures "The Last Song" Kicks Off Production in Georgia  | work = HollywoodOutbreak.com  | date = June 17, 2009  | url = http://www.hollywoodoutbreak.com/2009/06/17/the-last-song-has-begun/| access-date = June 18, 2009}}</ref> Ronnie's younger brother.
 Nick Lashaway as Marcus, Blaze's abusive boyfriend.
 Carly Chaikin as Blaze, a rebel who befriends Ronnie shortly after arriving in Georgia.
 Adam Barnett as Teddy, a friend of Marcus.
 Kate Vernon as Susan Blakelee, Will's disapproving mother.
 Nick Searcy as Tom Blakelee, Will's father.
 Melissa Ordway as Ashley, Will's ex-girlfriend.
 Carrie Malabre as Cassie, Ashley's best friend.
 Rhoda Griffis as one of Steve's doctors.
 Lance E. Nichols as Pastor Charlie Harris, the kind, devout pastor of the local church.
 Hallock Beals as Scott, Will's best friend.
 Stephanie Leigh Schlund as Megan Blakelee, Will's older sister.

Production
DevelopmentThe Last Song began when Disney executive Jason Reed met with Miley Cyrus to discuss her future career plans. At the time, Cyrus had been known mainly for starring as a pop star on Disney Channel's Hannah Montana, a children's television series that had expanded into a globally successful media franchise. As the series neared its end, Disney hoped to create a star vehicle to help Cyrus break out of the pop persona she had developed through the franchise and to introduce Cyrus to older audiences. During her meeting with Reed, Cyrus expressed a desire to film a movie similar to A Walk to Remember, a 2002 film based on a novel by Nicholas Sparks. A Walk to Remember helped Mandy Moore, then a teen pop star much like Cyrus, launch an acting career. Disney called Adam Shankman, director of A Walk to Remember, who signed on to produce the potential Cyrus film along with his sister and Offspring Entertainment production company partner, Jennifer Gibgot. Tish Cyrus, Cyrus' mother and co-manager, became the film's executive producer. Cyrus' acting representation, United Talent Agency, then contacted Sparks, also a UTA client, to ask if he had plans for a novel appropriate for a film adaptation starring Cyrus.

At the time, Sparks had been wrapping up The Lucky One and beginning to ponder an original plot for his next book. The author told himself he could "either go younger than 20 or older than 50", having recently written about every age in between. Wary of venturing above 50 again after his best-seller The Notebook, Sparks had already been leaning toward writing a teenager story when he received a phone call from Gibgot on behalf of the film in August 2008. Sparks recalled, "Jennifer asked if I had anything laying around? I said no, but funny you should say that…" Sparks returned with a premise by the end of July 2008. Once the proposal had been agreed upon by Cyrus, her family, and Offspring Entertainment, Sparks, with the aid of co-screenplay writer Jeff Van Wie, completed the screenplay before starting the book. Sparks explained that such an arrangement was necessary  to accommodate filming in summer 2009, as Disney had scheduled, but, "this is similar to the way it's gone with movies based on my novels; it's just out of order." Sparks and Van Wie completed the first draft of the screenplay in December 2008, the first rewrite later that month, and the second and final rewrite in January 2009. Both rewrites took about one or two days, and Sparks found them relatively simple. The finished screenplay was approximately 100 pages long. While The Last Song is not the first screenplay Sparks has written, it is his first to be optioned for film. The novel was completed in June 2009, the same time shooting for the film began, and was published on September 8, 2009 by Grand Central Publishing. The plot of the film and novel remained secret throughout development.

Julie Anne Robinson signed on to direct the film in May 2009, attracted by the emotion present in the story. The Last Song is Robinson's first feature film, although she is a veteran of television and theater. Robinson previously helmed episodes of American series such as Weeds and Grey's Anatomy and earned a Golden Globe nomination and a BAFTA award for her work on the BBC series Viva Blackpool.

In a June 2009 blog entry, Cyrus said she had "always been a fan of Nicholas Sparks" and that she had been waiting to do a production separate from the Hannah Montana franchise "for a long time", but had not found the time to do so due to her TV show, music, tours, and Hannah Montana: The Movie. To film The Last Song, Cyrus' contract for season four of Hannah Montana included an extra-long hiatus.

Writing and title
Recognizing the popularity of A Walk to Remember as both a novel and film, Sparks "put all [his] thoughts into that, trying to make the story as different from A Walk to Remember as [he could], but try to capture the same feelings." Sparks' experiences as a father and as a high-school track and field coach also helped shape the plot, and characters Jonah Miller and Will Blakelee are respectively based on Sparks' sons Landon and Miles. Sparks felt Ronnie was the hardest character to write for because he had "never been a 17-year-old, angry teenage[d] girl". Ronnie became a composite character inspired by several young women Sparks has known, such as his nieces. Cyrus herself influenced Ronnie fairly little, although her singing career did inspire the musical elements of the story. Ronnie plays only the piano and Cyrus only sings a small amount in the film, though she does contribute to its soundtrack.

Disney did not give Sparks limitations on the topics featured in The Last Song, which include underaged drinking, infidelity, and terminal illness, but Sparks says that Disney desired to work with him in part because "they've read my novels. My teenagers… don't do bad things. I just don't write that. I don't write about adultery, I don't write profanity ... I'll certainly have love scenes in my novels, but they're always between consenting adults." Still, Sparks acknowledges that elements of the screenplay may have been toned down by the director or the studio after he finished. As dictated by the Writers Guild of America, Sparks receives full credit for his work, although the amount of his original screenplay retained in the film is uncertain. For example, Sparks says the character of Marcus, leader of the gang of thugs, was likely altered for the film.

The project remained nameless for several months after Sparks' initial meeting with Disney in July 2008. Sparks wrote in a September 2008 online chat that "I have the idea completed, but no title. That's common for me though. Titles come last." The film was referred to by the working title "Untitled Miley Cyrus Project" In March 2009, Variety magazine called "The Last Song" a "tentative" title.

Casting
Cyrus chose the name "Ronnie" for her character in honor of her grandfather, Ron Cyrus, who died in 2006. Unknown to many, the character had first been named "Kirby" by Sparks and later changed to "Hilary".
New interviews with Sparks reveal he imagined Cyrus in the role "only a little" during the writing process.
At the completion of the screenplay, Sparks was concerned that Cyrus would not be able to successfully execute the role: "The first thing I thought when I finished the screenplay was, wow, I hope she can do this, this is a tough role because I'm bringing you through a whole gamut of emotion and you're just a 16-year-old girl who's done the Disney Channel. Are you able to do this as an actress?", After visiting the set and watching Cyrus film, Sparks' worries abated. To play the New York teen, Cyrus worked with a dialect coach to lose her Southern accent and learned to play classical piano. After she completed filming, Cyrus said that in a case of life imitating art, she had matured and "changed a lot" over the course of her summer in Georgia, similar to the way Ronnie does in the film. "Showing this movie, I feel like I'm really showing a part of my growth as a person as well. So I'm really excited for people to see it."

In April 2009, Disney officials chose Rafi Gavron for the part of Will Blakelee, but switched to Australian actor Liam Hemsworth by May. On May 18, 2009, the decision to cast Greg Kinnear as Steve Miller was made final. Kelly Preston's part as Kim was the first role she had accepted since the death of her son, Jett Travolta. After being introduced to Cal Johnson, the film's stunt coordinator, Adam Barnett landed the role of Teddy in May 2009 due to his previously developed talent in juggling and hackey sack.

Post-productionThe Last Song entered post-production following the end of filming on August 18, 2009. Automated dialogue replacement took place in mid-September; Beals and Chaikin stated they had gone in to record on September 11 and September 18, respectively. Chaikin said she had worked for five and a half hours. The director's cut was presented to the studio on October 1, 2009. The Motion Picture Association of America reviewed the film and issued it a PG rating for "thematic material, some violence, sensuality and mild language" three weeks later.

Filming
Move to GeorgiaThe Last Song had originally been set in Wrightsville Beach and Wilmington in North Carolina. Though they wished to shoot on location, filmmakers also examined three other states and identified Georgia as the next-best filming site.
Georgia's housing prices were higher, but the state's filming incentive package refunded 30% of production costs such as gasoline and salaries. North Carolina's package refunded 15% and excluded salaries of over $1 million. Still, Disney remained interested in North Carolina and offered to film there if the state would reduce the amount the company would save in Georgia, around $1 million, in half. North Carolina officials searched for ways to accomplish this, including applying unsuccessfully for state and Golden LEAF Foundation grants. They also introduced legislation to improve the state's refund to 25%, which eventually passed on August 27, 2009. Disney decided to work within existing incentive laws and agreed to film in North Carolina as long as the film rights they had bought from Sparks counted as a production cost, thereby saving the company an additional $125,000 to $225,000. Then-North Carolina Governor Bev Perdue set up a press conference on April 1, 2009, to announce N.C.'s victory. North Carolina tax collectors refused to consider the film rights, forcing Perdue to cancel the conference at the last second. "I was hopeful to say that it was coming and now I don't know that I'll get to say that," Perdue said. "Nobody knows what's going to happen [...] I don't know what figures they got from Georgia, but Georgia wants them badly, and we want them badly, and by Monday [April 6, 2009], there'll be four or five other states that want them badly." Johnny Griffin, director of the Wilmington Regional Film Commission, explains: "Disney makes feature films. They also make television series; they make individual movies for the Disney Channel. By losing this one project, in essence, we've lost all of those opportunities." He also notes the loss of jobs and tourism filming would have created.

On April 9, 2009, after three months of deliberation, the decision to relocate to Georgia was made final. To determine the specific town, location scouts scoured the state for an aged, isolated, oceanfront property to use as the Miller family's home in the film. After another three months and the discovery of the "Adams Cottage" on the southern tip of Tybee Island, Tybee and neighboring locations became the sites of filming in late March, with the intention of masquerading the area as Wilmington and Wrightsville Beach, North Carolina. The locale proved too unique to disguise. "We had a hard time trying to hide the fact that this was Tybee and Savannah was Savannah," said Bass Hampton, the film's location director. Filmmakers convinced the screenwriters to change the setting of the film and to Tybee Island, thus allowing them to incorporate landmarks such as the Tybee Island Light Station and the Savannah Historic District. The setting of Sparks' novel remained in North Carolina. Though other movies have been filmed in Tybee Island, The Last Song is the first to be both filmed and set in Tybee Island. With the city's name plastered on everything from police cars to businesses, Georgia officials predicted a lasting effect on the economy. In addition, The Last Song is estimated to have brought up to 500 summer jobs to Georgia, $8 million to local businesses, and $17.5 million to state businesses.

Sets

Nelson Coates is the production designer for The Last Song, responsible for all visual aspects of the movie. Coates, who was nominated for an Emmy Award for his work on the Stephen King television miniseries The Stand, arrived 11 weeks prior to the start of filming to do prep work. While most of the filming took place on the natural Tybee Island beach or on preconstructed private property, Coates oversaw the re-painting of the pier and the construction of the carnival and church.

Location scouts had searched the entirety of Georgia for an aged, isolated, oceanfront property to use as a home for the Millers for nearly three months before scout Andy Young came across the "Adams Cottage" on the southern end of Tybee Island. "It was getting down to zero hour," said Young. "Often, it's about the house. It can be a character itself in the movie." The house's owner, Sam Adams, welcomed filming as "an opportunity to sort of immortalize the house," in case it is destroyed by storms. The two-story, six bedroom house was built by Adams' great-grandfather in 1918 and was made entirely out of hard pine wood with very few painted surfaces. According to Savannah Morning News reporter Lesley Conn, it "was built in classic rambling beach style [... designed] to allow ocean breezes to sweep through wide, wraparound porches into cool, heart-pine rooms."

The church set was built over a six-week period on a vacant lot on the corner of 13th Street and Sixth Avenue, near residential homes. The one-room,  building seats roughly 80 people and is estimated to be worth $250,000 to $350,000. Special-effects coordinator Will Purcell subdued concerns about the church burning scene by stating that the building would not actually be set on fire. The intended menacing effect is "all camera angles. It is a safe environment for actors to do their work." Several techniques were used to simulate the fire, including the use of propane pipes to shoot flames through the church windows. At the end of filming, Cyrus hoped to fly the church set back to her family's estate in Tennessee. Disney agreed to donate the building to the island after Tybee officials lobbied to keep it, with the condition that its connection to The Last Song not be advertised. The set will be moved to a new location and brought up to code for use as a nondenominational chapel for island weddings; renovations are expected to cost approximately $600,000.

Shooting schedule

Cyrus' busy schedule necessitated that filming take place over the summer. Sparks noted, "She's got a fall music tour and then she's back filming Hannah Montana in the spring again. So, the only time she had free in her schedule was over the summer."
Principal photography began on June 15, 2009 and finished on August 18, 2009. Filming did not take place during weekends.

On the first day of production, Cyrus and Hemsworth filmed a kiss in the ocean. Other scenes which took place in June included the carnival and volleyball tournament, both of which were filmed on the beach near the Tybee Island pier. Filming at the pier wrapped up on June 23, 2009 after shooting the scene in which Kim drops off Ronnie and Jonah to live with Steve. Scenes of the church fire were shot on July 10, 2009. Filming at the Georgia Tech Savannah campus began on July 16. Kinnear finished taping on July 17, 2009. Wedding scenes and a key driving scene were filmed at the Wormsloe Historic Site between July 20 and July 23 for twelve hours each day. Driving scenes in Isle of Hope, Georgia continued to the 28. By July 30, the movie had returned to Tybee Island for more beach scenes. Chaikin's character framed Cyrus' for stealing a watch on August 6. On August 10, Hemsworth performed an oil change and Cyrus browsed an upscale boutique in downtown Savannah for the movie. The funeral was filmed from August 11, 2009 to August 13, 2009 at the church set in Tybee Island. On August 15, further church burning scenes took place. The wrap party was held on the 16, and the cast and crew arrived in Atlanta the following day to spend the last days of filming at the Georgia Aquarium. After analyzing the area on the 17th, the movie began shooting in public areas at dawn on the 18th to avoid crowds. Once the aquarium opened to the public at 10:00, filming shifted to behind-the-scenes areas.

Loggerhead sea turtles

Due to the conflicting personalities of his protagonist couple, Sparks faced difficulty in finding a vehicle that would draw Will and Ronnie to spend time together. "It had to be during the summer, she [Ronnie] had to be new in town, and whatever happened had to start in June and end in August. Because you always want a conclusion," said Sparks of his requirements. He mentioned summer camp or a summer job as typical vehicles used in books, but dismissed them as unoriginal and boring. "So it's got to be original, it's got to be interesting, and at the same time it's got to be universal, that you feel like it could happen to anybody." Sparks eventually chose to have Will and Ronnie bond over a loggerhead sea turtle nest, knowing that loggerhead eggs often hatch in August. The scene of the hatching nest took place during the first week of August and involved 26 live loggerhead sea turtle hatchlings. Sea turtle hatchlings have an innate sense to head toward the ocean water as soon as they are born, so scenes of the nest hatching had to be taken swiftly. Said Mike Dodd of the Georgia Department of Natural Resources, the biologist who supervised the scene, the hatchlings "did all they know how to do: They crawled down to the water and swam off." Sparks told an interviewer he suspected filmmakers would digitally add more turtles to the scene. At the time of filming, the loggerhead sea turtle was listed as a threatened species. The environmentally friendly theme was an added bonus to Tybee Island, which was then promoting ecotourism.

Soundtrack

"When I Look at You", song by Miley Cyrus, was originally from her EP The Time of Our Lives released August 31, 2009, but was included on the soundtrack because it fit the movie well. The song is used in the background of the film's trailer.

At the launch of his album Cradlesong on June 30, 2009, Rob Thomas told the New York Daily News, "My buddy Adam Shankman, who just directed Miley's movie, called me on the phone the other day and was like, 'You have to write a song for this movie.'... I would definitely write a song for her [Cyrus]." In the end, however, Thomas was unable to contribute music to The Last Song, citing "scheduling problems" as the reason.

The soundtrack features a track by Casey McPherson, frontman of the band Alpha Rev which signed with Disney's Hollywood Records in August 2008. Variety magazine's Anthony D'Alessandro notes that the use of soundtracks as "launch pads" for new Disney artists is a common practice. "A Different Side of Me" by Allstar Weekend was also included on the soundtrack. They are a group newly signed to Hollywood Records after winning the N.B.T. Competition through the Disney Channel. The soundtrack was released in the U.S. on March 23, 2010.
Though not featured on soundtrack, Snow Patrol's 2006 single "Shut Your Eyes" and Feist's "I Feel It All" also appear in the film. The soundtrack had a major increase in sales in the week of the DVD release. The soundtrack peaked at #104 on the Billboard 200 albums chart.

Track listing

Charts

Singles
"When I Look at You" was released as a single on February 16, 2010. It has peaked at #16 on the US Hot 100 and #24 on the Canadian Hot 100.

Other songs
"I Hope You Find It" is a track from the album. It received a large amount of digital downloads after the album was made available for online purchase. It debuted at #8 on Bubbling Under Hot 100 Singles chart in the week ending April 10, 2010 and peaked at #5 a week later before it dropped out in the week ending April 24, 2010. In September 2013, the song received media attention for being covered by Cher for her 25th studio album Closer to the Truth.

Release

 
Walt Disney Studios Motion Pictures originally scheduled The Last Song for wide release on January 8, 2010, but was delayed from January 8, 2010 to March 31, 2010.

Marketing
Upon the release of the novel on September 8, Sparks began a book tour reaching around 13 cities and gave several interviews. During these events, he discussed writing both the novel and the screenplay. Cyrus and Walt Disney Studios Chairman Dick Cook discussed the film on September 11, 2009 at the first D23 Expo. The first clips from the film appeared online on September 11, 2009, interspersed within one version of the "When I Look at You" music video. The film's first trailer was integrated into Cyrus' Wonder World Tour and premiered during the tour's opening night on September 14, 2009 in Portland, Oregon. Midway through each concert, the trailer was shown on large video screens surrounding the stage. After it finished, Cyrus played a white piano and sang "When I Look at You" while film clips continued to play on the screens behind her. On November 16, 2009, the first three film stills were released via the film's Facebook page. The following day, the film's trailer premiered online. The film's premiere was held in Los Angeles on March 25, 2010.
Cyrus was originally planned to go to the UK premiere of the film, but due to the April 14, 2010 eruption of the volcano Eyjafjallajökull that blanketed Europe in volcanic ash and grounded all flights to and from the continent, she was unable to attend.

Home mediaThe Last Song was released on DVD and Blu-ray on August 17, 2010.

Reception
Box officeThe Last Song performed well for when it was released for the first time, garnering $5,125,103 on approximately 3,300 screens at 2,673 theaters for an average of $1,917 per theater.https://www.webcitation.org/5og1IlDvJ?url=http://www.boxofficemojo.com/movies/?id=lastsong.htm 

It has grossed $62,950,384 in North America and $26,091,272 in other territories for a worldwide total of $89,041,656.

In its opening weekend, the film grossed $16,007,426, finishing fourth at the box office behind Clash of the Titans ($61,235,105), Why Did I Get Married Too? ($29,289,537) and How to Train Your Dragon ($29,010,044).

Critical responseThe Last Song was panned by critics. , the film holds a 21% approval rating on the review aggregation website Rotten Tomatoes, based on 119 reviews with an average rating of 4.01/10. The critical consensus is summarized: "As shamelessly manipulative as any Nicholas Sparks production, The Last Song is done no favors by its miscast and over matched star, Miley Cyrus." Metacritic, which assigns normalized ratings to films, The Last Song holds a "generally unfavorable" score of 33% based on 27 reviews.

Reviewers were critical of Sparks' and Van Wie's screenplay and formulaic storyline. Mick LaSalle of the San Francisco Chronicle says the screenplay's faults include several "scenes that make no emotional sense" and claims, "The plot construction is weak. Incidents don't flow one into the next." When reviewing Cyrus's performance, critics acknowledged her stage presence, but were frequently critical of her acting abilities. Jay Stone of The Ottawa Citizen says Cyrus's portrayal of angry Ronnie "consist[s] of pouting and sneering [...] Cyrus doesn't have a lot of range, but she does have presence."
Rob Nelson of Variety writes, "Cyrus, alas, hasn't yet learned not to act [...] But she does show off her considerable chops as a pianist and remains reasonably likable throughout." A. O. Scott of The New York Times believes that although "her Hannah Montana persona has a certain aggressive charm", in The Last Song she "play-act[s] rather than exploring the motives and feelings of her character."
Roger Ebert gave the film a mixed 2.5/4. He praised the acting and directing, but derided the plot and Sparks's writing.

Kinnear's performance has been widely praised. A. O. Scott writes, "it's nice to see Mr. Kinnear play an entirely sympathetic character for a change [but] his slyness and subtlety seem wasted in a project that has no interest in either." Michael Phillips of The Chicago Tribune writes, "Reliably honest and affecting, [Kinnear] fights off the waves of corn in much the same way that Tibetan monk defied the tsunami in 2012."
Glen Whipp of the Associated Press writes, "Kinnear lends the movie a dignity it doesn't deserve". Stone advises, "I'd watch out for Liam Hemsworth".
Stephen Witty of The Star-Ledger commends "newcomer Carly Chaikin [who] plays the "bad girl" ... with an exciting mixture of wildness and vulnerability. Halfway in, I began wishing desperately that Chaikin was playing the lead."
Reception for Coleman was mixed; Jeff Vice of "Deseret News" calls him a "hammy irritant"  while Jon Bream of the Star Tribune'' writes, "The most memorable acting is by Coleman, 12 [... who] gets a lot of great lines and delivers them with aplomb".

Accolades

References

External links

 
 
 
 
 

2010s coming-of-age films
2010 romantic drama films
2010 films
2010s teen drama films
2010s teen romance films
American coming-of-age films
American romantic drama films
American teen drama films
American teen romance films
Coming-of-age drama films
Coming-of-age romance films
2010 directorial debut films
Films about cancer
Films about death
Films about vacationing
Films based on romance novels
Films based on works by Nicholas Sparks
Films directed by Julie Anne Robinson
Films scored by Aaron Zigman
Films set in Georgia (U.S. state)
Films shot in Georgia (U.S. state)
Films shot in Savannah, Georgia
Touchstone Pictures films
2010s English-language films
2010s American films